The 2006 Trophée des Champions was a football match held at Stade Gerland, Lyon on 30 July 2006 that saw 2005–06 Ligue 1 champions Lyon defeat 2005–06 Coupe de France champions Paris Saint-Germain 5–4 on penalties following a 1–1 draw after normal time.

Match

Details

See also
2005–06 Ligue 1
2005–06 Coupe de France

External links
Match Statistics

2006–07 in French football
2006
Olympique Lyonnais matches
Paris Saint-Germain F.C. matches
Association football penalty shoot-outs
July 2006 sports events in France
Sports competitions in Lyon